The American Music Theatre Project (AMTP) is a project at Northwestern University that associates the faculty and students at Northwestern with professional working artists of the music theatre to develop new musicals. It was founded in 2005.

History 
In 2022 AMTP announced Alexander Gemignani as its new artistic director.

Musicals Produced

 Was (October 28 – November 13, 2005): Music by Joe Thalken, Book and lyrics by Barry Kleinbort, Based on the novel by Geoff Ryman, Directed by Tina Landau; Barber Theater
 Paradise Lost (February 11-12, 2006): Composed and conducted by Eric Whitacre; Pick Staiger Concert Hall
 Edges (June 22–25, 2006): By Benj Pasek & Justin Paul; Directed by Travis Greisler; Louis Theater
 The Boys Are Coming Home (Opened July 28, 2006): Music and lyrics by Leslie Arden; Book by Berni Stapleton; Inspired by an idea from Timothy French; Directed by Gary Griffin; Barber Theater
 Asphalt Beach (October 27–November 12, 2006): Music and lyrics by Andrew Lippa; Book by T.C. Smith and Peter Spears; Directed by Amanda Dehnert; Louis Theater
 In The Bubble (July 27–August 12, 2007): Music and lyrics by Michael Friedman and Joe Popp; Book by Rinne Groff; Directed by Michael Greif; Barber Theater
 Time After Time (November 13, 2007): Book and Lyrics Stephen Cole; Music Jeffrey Saver; Directed by Philip Markle; Louis Theater
 Dangerous Beauty (July 25 – August 17, 2008 ): Book by Jeannine Dominy; Lyrics by Amanda McBroom; Music by Michele Brourman; Directed by Sheryl Kaller; Barber Theater
 Adapted from the screenplay The Honest Courtesan written by Jeannine Dominy, released as the film Dangerous Beauty Inspired by the scholarly book The Honest Courtesan by Margaret Rosenthal
 Moby Dick: An American Opera (November 24, 2008): Book and lyrics Mark St. Germain; Music by Doug Katsaros; Directed by Geoff Button; Wallis Theater
 Next Thing You Know (February 20–22, 2009): Music Joshua Salzman; Lyrics Ryan Cunningham; Directed by David Bell; Struble Theater
 Girls vs. Boys (July 10–August 2, 2009): Music by Kevin O'Donnell; Book and lyrics by Chris Mathews, Jake Minton and Nathan Allen; Choreography by Tommy Rapley; Directed by Nathan Allen; Wallis Theater
 Developed in Association with The House Theatre of Chicago
 A Doctor in Spite of Himself (August 8, 2009): Musical comedy based on Le Medicin malgre lui by Molière; Book Jean-Baptiste Poquelin; English adaptation, score and additional dialogue Sheldon Harnick; Directed by Dominic Missimi; Barber Theater
 Ace (September 25–27, 2009): Book & Lyrics Robert Taylor and Richard Oberacker; Directed by David H. Bell; Wallis Theater
 Not Wanted on The Voyage (July 16 – August 8, 2010): Music and lyrics by Neil Bartram; Book by Brian Hill; Based on the novel by Timothy Findley; Directed by Amanda Dehnert; Barber Theater
 Fly By Night: A New Musical (February 14–27, 2011): Directed by Bill Fennelly; Struble Theater
 In association with TheatreWorks Silicon Valley
 Painted Alice: A New Musical (March 3 – 13, 2011): Music and Lyrics by Michael Mahler; Book by Bill Donnelley; Directed by David H. Bell
 Hero (September 5–18, 2011): Music and Lyrics by Michael Mahler; Book by Aaron Thielen; Directed by Jess McLeod; Struble Theater
 Triangle (September 19–October 2, 2011): Music by Curtis Moore, Lyrics by Thomas Mizer, Book by Thomas Mizer, Curtis Moore and Joshua Scherer; Directed by Meredith McDonough; Struble Theater
 The Verona Project (October 19–November 4, 2012): Written and Directed by Amanda Dehnert; Louis Theater
 Found (May 29–31, 2013): By Hunter Bell, Lee Overtree and Eli Bolin; Directed by Lee Overtree; Wallis Theater
 Mr. Chickee's Funny Money (July 29 – August 9, 2013): Based on the book by Christopher Paul Curtis; Book by David Ingber; Music and Lyrics by Lamont Dozier and Paris Dozier; Directed by Derrick Sanders; Wallis Theater
 The Rules of Love (March 12, 2013; March 4–9, 2014): Music by Demir Demirkan and Sertab Erener; Lyrics and Book by David H. Bell; Directed by David H. Bell; Wallis Theater
 The Legend of New York (May 18–30, 2014): Music by Joshua Salzman Lyrics and Book by Ryan Cunningham Directed by John Simpkins; Wallis Theater
 Scrooge In Love!: Book by Duane Poole Music by Larry Grossman Lyrics by Kellen Blair Directed by Geoff Button WORKSHOP: November 13–23, 2014 | Wallis Theater PREMIERE: 2016 | Eureka Theatre
 The Proxy Marriage (2017)
 The Woman in Question (November 29–December 6, 2017): directed by Ryan Cunningham
 Picture Perfect (February 3–10 2018): directed by Scott Evans
 Marie in Tomorrowland (February 17–24, 2018): Directed by Sam Pinkleton
 [re: CLICK] (June 18-30 2021)

References

External links
 American Music Theatre Project homepage

Musical theatre organizations
Northwestern University
Drama schools in the United States
2005 establishments in Illinois
Educational institutions established in 2005
Theatre in Illinois